The men's hammer throw event at the 2019 African Games was held on 29 August in Rabat.

Results

References

Hammer
African Games